The 1962–63 season was the 61st season of competitive football played by Dundee. The club finished in ninth place in Division One, as well as competing in the Scottish Cup, Scottish League Cup, and European Cup after winning the league the season prior.

Dundee's European Cup run was the main focus of the season, as the Dark Blues made it to the tournament's semi-finals. They recorded large victories throughout the campaign, including 8–1 against German champions 1. FC Köln, a 4–1 win over Portuguese side Sporting CP, home and away victories over R.S.C. Anderlecht, and an unlikely win over eventual European champions A.C. Milan.

Alan Gilzean was Dundee's top scorer with 24 in the league and 41 overall, including a 7-goal game against Queen of the South which tied Albert Juliussen's club record for most goals in a single game.

Scottish Division One 

Statistics provided by Dee Archive.

League table

European Cup 

Statistics provided by Dee Archive.

Scottish League Cup 

Statistics provided by Dee Archive.

Group 2 table

Scottish Cup 

Statistics provided by Dee Archive.

Squad and statistics

Player statistics 
Statistics provided by Dee Archive

|}

See also 
 1962–63 in Scottish football

References 

Dundee F.C. seasons
Dundee